Freddie and the Dreamers is the eponymous debut album from the British Invasion band Freddie and the Dreamers from Manchester, England. It was released in the United Kingdom in 1963, peaking at number five in the UK Albums Chart and reaching number 19 in the US albums chart on May 22, 1965. It was the only 33 RPM record by the group to chart in America.

Track listing
Side one
"If You Gotta Make a Fool of Somebody" (Rudy Clark) - 1:58
"Some Other Guy" (Richie Barrett, Jerry Leiber and Mike Stoller [as Elmo Glick]) - 2:05
"Somebody Else's Girl" (Montgomery) - 2:26
"Yes I Do" (MacLaine, Bocking, Weatton) - 1:50
"Zip-a-Dee-Doo-Dah" (Voc. Pete Birrell and Roy Crewdson) (Ray Gilbert,  Allie Wrubel) - 3;15
"Drink This Up It'll Make You Sleep" (Mitch Murray) - 1:50
"I Understand" (Best) - 2:34

Side two
"Sally Anne" (Klein) - 1:58
"I'm a Hog for You" (Voc. Pete Birrell) (Jerry Leiber, Mike Stoller) - 2:10
"The Wedding" (Jay, Prieto) - 2:35
"Money (That's What I Want)" (Berry Gordy, Janie Bradford) - 2:23
"Crying" (Roy Orbison, Joe Melson) - 3:02
"He Got What He Wanted (but He Lost What He Had)" (Richard Penniman) - 2:09
"Kansas City" - 2:22

Personnel
Freddie Garrity – vocals
Derek Quinn – lead guitar
Roy Crewdson – rhythm guitar and vocals
Pete Birrell – bass guitar and vocals
Bernie Dwyer – drums

References

1963 debut albums
Freddie and the Dreamers albums
EMI Columbia Records albums